Charles Archer  (1861–1941) was an administrator in British India, he served as the Chief Commissioner of  Baluchistan province four times. He collaborated with his brother William in translating three of Ibsen's plays: Rosmersholm, Lady Inger of Ostrat, and Peer Gynt.  He was appointed CIE in the 1906 New Year Honours and CSI in the 1911 Delhi Durbar Honours.

References

External links
 
 

1861 births
1941 deaths
Chief Commissioners of Baluchistan
Companions of the Order of the Indian Empire
Companions of the Order of the Star of India